The castra of Duleu - Odăi was a fort in the Roman province of Dacia. It was built in the 2nd century and abandoned in the 4th century. A contemporary necropolis was also unearthed near the fort. The ruins of the castra are located in Duleu (commune Fârliug, Romania).

See also
List of castra

Notes

External links
Roman castra from Romania - Google Maps / Earth

Roman legionary fortresses in Romania
Roman legionary fortresses in Dacia
History of Banat
Historic monuments in Caraș-Severin County